Kareem Huggins (born May 24, 1986) is an American football running back for the Brooklyn Bolts of the Fall Experimental Football League (FXFL) He was signed by the Tampa Bay Buccaneers as an undrafted free agent in 2009. Huggins graduated from Bayley Ellard High School in New Jersey and played college football at Hofstra University.

Professional career

Tampa Bay Buccaneers
He was signed by the Tampa Bay Buccaneers as an undrafted free agent prior to the 2009 season. After his September release, Huggins was signed to the Buccaneers' practice squad, where he remained until his activation to the active roster for Week 16 in December.

Huggins earned a backup running back spot in camp in 2010, but a week 6 knee injury against the New Orleans Saints ended his season, landing him on injured reserve. The severe knee injury led to the Buccaneers not tendering Huggins a contract for the 2011 season.

New England Patriots
Huggins was signed by the New England Patriots on August 4, 2012, after spending the 2011 season out of football. He was released the next day.

New York Jets
He was signed to the New York Jets' practice squad on September 25, 2013. He was released on October 2, 2013.

References

External links
New England Patriots bio

1986 births
Living people
American football running backs
Hofstra Pride football players
People from Irvington, New Jersey
Tampa Bay Buccaneers players
New England Patriots players
New York Jets players
Brooklyn Bolts players